Newark Broad Street  is a NJ Transit commuter rail and light rail station at 25 University Avenue in Newark in Essex County, New Jersey, United States. Built in 1903, the station's historic architecture includes an elegant clock tower and a brick and stone façade on the station's main building.

History
The current station is the second on the site. The original station opened on November 19, 1836, at the east end of the opening segment of the Morris and Essex Railroad to Orange; for the first couple of decades trains east of Newark ran over the New Jersey Rail Road to Jersey City. The present station opened in 1903 after two years of construction, located on the Delaware, Lackawanna and Western Railroad main line from Hoboken to Denville, Scranton and Buffalo The Newark Drawbridge connecting to the station and crossing the Passaic River to the east also opened in 1903. A number of western expansions were built, and Hoboken Terminal, the current eastern end of the line, opened in 1907. In 1945, the Morris and Essex Railroad officially merged into the Lackawanna Railroad, which had leased it since 1868 (though the Morris and Essex' separate identity had been largely lost years before). DL&W merged with the Erie Railroad in 1960 to form the Erie Lackawanna Railroad, which was absorbed by Conrail in 1976; NJ Transit has operated all passenger service since 1983.

The station had served several Lackawanna and then Erie Lackwanna passenger trains. These included the Lake Cities, Owl/New York Mail, Twilight/Pocono Express and the DLW flagship train, the Phoebe Snow. However, all intercity service ended by 1970.

The station building has been listed in the state and federal registers of historic places since 1984 and is part of the Operating Passenger Railroad Stations Thematic Resource.

Renovation
From 2004 to 2008 the station was renovated. The station changed from having two outside low platforms, with walkways across one track to the middle track, to having two high platforms, one of them an island platform, to facilitate cross-platform transfers. The historic westbound shelter was removed in the project and new westbound waiting areas were built.

Station layout and services
Broad Street Station is currently served by the Montclair-Boonton Line and both branches of the Morris and Essex Lines –– the Morristown Line and Gladstone Branch. All three lines either proceed to Secaucus Junction en route to New York Penn Station or terminate in Hoboken.

This station is also the northern terminus of the Newark Light Rail Broad Street Extension line from Newark Penn Station. Service on this line opened on July 17, 2006, although light rail service was unavailable from March through July 2008 due to a partial collapse of the former Westinghouse factory adjacent to the station during demolition. This allows passengers on the two commuter lines serving Broad Street to easily transfer to Newark Penn, and vice versa. Previously, passengers wishing to transfer in Newark had to make their own way (usually by bus or taxi) between the two stations.

Gallery

Bibliography

References

External links

Newark N.J. DL&W, by John C. Dahl (Great Railroad Stations Index - RSHS/Train Web)

NJ Transit Rail Operations stations
Newark Light Rail stations
Railway stations in the United States opened in 1903
Railway stations on the National Register of Historic Places in New Jersey
Transportation in Newark, New Jersey
Transit hubs serving New Jersey
Former Delaware, Lackawanna and Western Railroad stations
Colonial Revival architecture in New Jersey
Renaissance Revival architecture in New Jersey
Clock towers in New Jersey